Lago Bianco (Italian for "white lake") is a lake in the Province of Vercelli, Piedmont, Italy. At an elevation of 2332 m, its surface area is 0.03 km².

Lakes of Piedmont
Province of Vercelli